Kapho is a district (amphoe) in Pattani province, southern Thailand.

History
The minor district (king amphoe) Kapho was formed on 15 March 1982 by splitting off three southern tambons from Sai Buri district. On 4 November 1993 it was upgraded to a full district.

Geography
Neighboring districts are (from the northwest clockwise): Thung Yang Daeng and Sai Buri of Pattani Province; Bacho of Narathiwat province; and Raman of Yala province.

Administration
The district is divided into three sub-districts (tambons), which are further subdivided into 22 villages (mubans). There are no municipal (thesaban) areas. There are three tambon administrative organizations (TAO).

References

External links
amphoe.com

Districts of Pattani province